Burji can refer to
 Burji dynasty, a dynasty that ruled Egypt from 1382 until 1517
 Burji people, an ethnic group in Ethiopia and Kenya
 Burji language, a language spoken in Ethiopia and Kenya
 Burji special woreda, an administrative subdivision of Ethiopia

See also
Bhurji (disambiguation)
Burgi (disambiguation)
Burgis (disambiguation)
Burj (disambiguation)

Language and nationality disambiguation pages